Bruce Martyn (born June 24, 1929) is a former American sportscaster, logging over 45 years behind the mic.  Martyn was the radio voice of the Detroit Red Wings from 1964–1995.

After earning his degree from Michigan Tech at the Soo (now Lake Superior State University) in his hometown of Sault Ste. Marie, Michigan, Bruce Martyn started in broadcasting doing play-by-play for the Soo Indians of the Northern Ontario Hockey Association on WSOO-AM in 1950.  It was there he met wife Donna, a rabid hockey fan in her own right.

Bruce moved his career south to the Detroit market at WCAR-AM in 1953. He could be heard on radio assignments throughout Michigan on the weekly syndicated talk show This Week in Michigan, as well as coverage of Michigan State Spartans football, the Detroit Pistons and Detroit Lions. After 10 years, he moved to TV and the UHF station WKBD-TV, then a station devoted to sports.

It did not take long for Martyn to be discovered by the Red Wings, who offered him a job broadcasting home and away games in 1964.  Martyn served the team for 31 seasons, most partnered with NHL icon Sid Abel. He became best known for the phrase, "He shoots, he scores!"

Martyn retired after the 1994–95 Red Wing season, but returned in 1997 to call the second period of the team's Stanley Cup clincher.  He was presented with the Foster Hewitt Memorial Award for broadcasting by the Hockey Hall of Fame in Toronto in 1991 and inducted into the Michigan Sports Hall of Fame in 1996.  He is an Lifetime Member and a Past President of the Detroit Sports Media Association.

Sources
Detroit Sports Broadcasters Association
Michigan Sports Hall of Fame

1929 births
Living people
American sports announcers
College football announcers
Detroit Lions announcers
Detroit Pistons announcers
Detroit Red Wings announcers
Foster Hewitt Memorial Award winners
National Basketball Association broadcasters
National Football League announcers
National Hockey League broadcasters
People from Sault Ste. Marie, Michigan